Brotherston is a surname. Notable people with the surname include:

Dean Brotherston (born 1997), Scottish footballer 
Lez Brotherston (born 1961), British set and costume designer
Noel Brotherston (1956–1995), Northern Irish footballer

See also
Brotherton